Augustus Kenneth George Jackson (25 December 1903 – 12 November 1968) was a New Zealand rower.

He won two bronze medals at the 1938 British Empire Games, winning one as part of the men's eight and another bronze medal alongside Bob Smith in the men's double sculls. He was a member of the Union Boat Club (UBC) in Wanganui; fellow UBC members in the eight were James Gould and Howard Benge.

References

New Zealand male rowers
Rowers at the 1938 British Empire Games
Commonwealth Games bronze medallists for New Zealand
1903 births
1968 deaths
Commonwealth Games medallists in rowing
Medallists at the 1938 British Empire Games